Phellinidium ferrugineofuscum is a species of fungus belonging to the family Hymenochaetaceae.

It is native to Eurasia and Northern America.

References

Hymenochaetaceae